Women Chamber of Commerce & Industry Quetta is a semi-governmental organization, approved and recognized by the Ministry of Commerce. It is a non political trade body affiliated with Federation of Pakistan Chambers of Commerce & Industry and promoting women entrepreneurs. WCCI Quetta is the premier body of trade and industry of Balochistan. WCCI Quetta is promoting the interests of Balochistan Commercial & Industrial Community as well as economic activities.

It is also engaged among other things in assisting the entrepreneurs of Balochistan in developing capacity for sustainable trade promotion and industrial Developments supports infrastructures and access to market.

WCCI Quetta has more than 300 members.

See also 
Quetta
Economy of Pakistan
Federation of Pakistan Chambers of Commerce & Industry
International Chamber of Commerce
president of wqcci sonia kashmiri 
new appointment for new year 2020

References

External links 
 FPCCI Official website
SAARC Chamber of Commerce & Industry

Women's organisations based in Pakistan
Organisations based in Balochistan, Pakistan
Chambers of commerce in Pakistan